This is a list of Fantastic Beasts cast members who portrayed or voiced characters appearing in the film series. The list below is sorted by film and the character's surname, as some characters have been portrayed by multiple actors.

Cast and characters

See also
 Harry Potter cast members

Notes

References

External links
 Full cast and crew for Fantastic Beasts and Where to Find Them at IMDb
 Full cast and crew for The Crimes of Grindelwald at IMDb
 Full cast and crew for The Secrets of Dumbledore at IMDb

Cast members
Wizarding World lists
Lists of actors by film series